Mike Shepherd is the pen name of Mike Moscoe, an American science fiction writer who lives in Vancouver, Washington. He was born on August 2, 1947 in Philadelphia to a Navy family and travelled a lot as a child. It was not until high school that he finished a year in the school he started.

Literary career
Shepherd sold his first published writing to the science fiction magazine Analog. It was a short story called "Summer Hopes, Winter Dreams" and appeared in the March 1991 issue.

His short story "A Day's Work on the Moon" was nominated for the Nebula Award for Best Novelette in 2000.

Shepherd has written about one book a year. His first three books, the Lost Millennium series (First Dawn in 1996, Second Fire in 1997, and Lost Days in 1998) had a combined sales of just over 20,000 copies, so his editor suggested that he switch genres, to military science fiction set in the future. His next three books, the Society of Humanity series (The First Casualty in 1999, The Price of Peace in  2000, and They Also Serve in 2001) sold better, at over 10,000 copies each, but not as high as was hoped. To make a fresh start for his next series, his editor suggested that he write under a new pseudonym.

His third and ongoing series, published as "Mike Shepherd", covers the exploits of Kris Longknife, a rich young naval officer who struggles to deal with the expectations and reputation of her famous family of military leaders, politicians, and billionaires. The first book, Mutineer, was published in 2004 to greater success than his previous books. In a review for Tor.com, Liz Bourke described the series as "pure fluff" of the good kind, that is, intellectually lightweight but "entertainingly sticky, full of implausible successes, assassins, fleet actions and daredevil do-or-die gallantry".

His contract with Ace Books expired in 2016, ending a 2 decade relationship, and in 2017, he founded his own independent publisher, KL & MM Books, to continue publishing his works, especially the Society of Humanity fictional universe works.

List of works

Lost Millennium
written as Mike Moscoe

 First Dawn (1996) 
 Second Fire (1997) 
 Lost Days (1998)

Society of Humanity universe

Jump Universe books
First trilogy written as Mike Moscoe, originally referred to as "The Ray Longknife books", renamed in 2012 to "Jump Universe books" and republished under the name Mike Shepherd.

Unity War
 The First Casualty (Jan 1, 1999) 
 The Price of Peace (Jan 1, 2000) 
 They Also Serve (Jan 1, 2001) 
Interwar-period War
 To Do or Die (Feb 25, 2014) 
Iteeche War
 Rita Longknife: Enemy Unknown (Mar 5, 2017) ASIN B01N4L4582
 Rita Longknife: Enemy in Sight (Aug 31, 2017) ASIN B072JS9VNW

Kris Longknife books
Written as Mike Shepherd

 Mutineer (Jan 27, 2004) 
 Deserter (Nov 30, 2004) 
 Defiant (Oct 25, 2005) 
 3.5. Training Daze (Oct 4, 2011) Companion short novel ASIN B005LR5KNO
 Resolute (Oct 31, 2006) 
 Audacious (Oct 30, 2007) 
 Intrepid (Oct 28, 2008) 
 Undaunted (Oct 27, 2009) 
 Redoubtable (Oct 26, 2010)  — previously called Superb, changed after release of Undaunted where the author stated the next volume's working title in the "About the Author" blurb.
 Daring (Oct 25, 2011)  — crossover preceding the Vicky Peterwald trilogy, directly preceding Vicky Peterwald: Target
 9.5. Welcome Home/Go Away (Sep 25, 2012) Companion short novel ASIN B007FEFBEE
 Furious (Oct 30, 2012) 
 10.5. Kris Longknife's Bloodhound (Sep 3, 2013) Companion short novel ASIN B00F1KH098
 Defender (Oct 29, 2013) 
 Tenacious (Oct 28, 2014) 
 Unrelenting (Oct 27, 2015)  — previously called Relentless, changed to Unrelenting in March 2015 At the end, Kris Longknife is ordered back to human space and replaced by Sandy Santiago, beginning her series.
 13.5 Kris Longknife Among the Kicking Birds (Feb 6, 2017) ASIN B01MR8CBK7, This story was originally part of Kris Longknife - Unrelenting but these 7600 words had to be cut because the novel was too long. Now you can read the full story that was covered in one short paragraph in Unrelenting.
 Bold (Oct 25, 2016)  — crossover ending the Vicky Peterwald trilogy, directly succeeding Vicky Peterwald: Rebel
 14.1. Ruth Longknife's First Christmas: A Kris Longknife Christmas Companion short story (Dec 23, 2016) ASIN B01MQZ54RS
 14.9. Kris Longknife's Bad Day Companion short novel (Apr 2, 2017) ASIN B06X3YM79W, This story was the original opening chapters for Emissary, but was cut and replaced.
 Emissary (May 1, 2017) ASIN B01N2B8PC3 There is a 5-year gap between Bold and Emissary.  Not available in Trade Paperback, only available in oversized Paperback.
 Admiral (Nov 5, 2017) ASIN B075DFYGBL  Not available in Trade Paperback, only available in oversized Paperback.

 Commanding (May 1, 2018) ASIN B07BC89H8X  Not available in Trade Paperback, only available in oversized Paperback.

 Indomitable (April 25, 2019) ASIN B07R69PSND  Not available in Trade Paperback, only available in oversized Paperback.

 Stalwart (December 5, 2019) ASIN B07ZTV8RXN  Not available in Trade Paperback, only available in oversized Paperback.

Vicky Peterwald books
Written as Mike Shepherd

 0.5: Kris Longknife's Assassin (May 30, 2014)  — Short novel prequel to the Vicky Peterwald series
 Target (June 24, 2014)  — A spin-off from Kris Longknife: Daring 
 Survivor (May 26, 2015)  
Rebel (May 31, 2016)  
 Kris Longknife 14: Bold is the second crossover between the Kris Longknife and Vicky Peterwald series, taking place between Rebel and Dominator.
 Dominator (July 2, 2018) 
 Implacable (August 1, 2019)

Sandy Santiago books
Written as Mike Shepherd

 Kris Longknife's Replacement: Admiral Santiago on Alwa Station (Jan 5, 2017) ASIN B01N2P6WX3 Maria Sandy Santiago takes over Alva Station from Kris Longknife.
 1.5. Kris Longknife’s Maid Goes on Strike Segue between Replacement and Relief. ASIN B06ZY3HLJ9 Companion short story (Jun 1, 2017)
 Kris Longknife's Relief: Admiral Santiago on Alwa Station (July 1, 2017) ASIN B071JD5LC7
 Kris Longknife's Successor: Grand Admiral Santiago on Alwa Station (February 1, 2018) ASIN B0787JKQMP

Longknives books 

 Longknifes Defend the Legation (April 15, 2020) ASIN B085WDHDB5
 Occurs immediately after Kris Longknive's Indomitable

Works in others' series
 Patriot's Stand (MechWarrior: Dark Age series) (2004)  (Mike Moscoe)

Non-series books
 A Day's Work on the Moon: A Collection of Short Stories (2011)  (credited as Mike Shepherd and Mike Moscoe)
 The Job Interview: A Collection of Short Stories (2012)  (credited as Mike Shepherd and Mike Moscoe)
 The Strange Redemption of Sister Mary Ann: A Collection of Short Stories (2012)  (credited as Mike Shepherd and Mike Moscoe)

Businesses
In 2017, Mike Shepherd established his own independent publisher, KL & MM Books.

References

External links
 Mike Moscoe Profile at Fantastic Fiction
 Mike Shepherd Profile at Fantastic Fiction
 Author's Website
 Kris Longknife's Blog—official website for Jump Universe / Kris Longknife / Vicky Peterwald
 

1947 births
20th-century American novelists
21st-century American novelists
American male novelists
American science fiction writers
Living people
Military science fiction writers
Writers from Philadelphia
Writers from Vancouver, Washington
20th-century American male writers
21st-century American male writers
Novelists from Pennsylvania
Novelists from Washington (state)